The following is a list of events relating to television in Ireland from 1965.

Events

January – RTÉ and BBC collaborate on an historic television broadcast as Taoiseach Seán Lemass and Prime Minister of Northern Ireland Terence O'Neill meet for the first time in Belfast.
4 January – First airing of The Riordans, a rural drama serial, which became the inspiration for the UK soap Emmerdale Farm.
20 March – Ireland enters the Eurovision Song Contest for the first time with I'm Walking the Streets in the Rain performed by Butch Moore.
7 April – Ireland's first televised General Election coverage, presented by John O'Donoghue and produced by Gerry Murray.
21 April – Joseph Brennan is appointed Minister for Posts and Telegraphs.
2 May – Telefís Feirme, an innovative programme designed for group viewing and discussions in rural communities is first aired.
May – Second RTÉ Authority appointed.
9 October – The famous popular British cult 1960s marionette series Thunderbirds begins its first television broadcast on RTÉ after airing in its country of origin the previous month.

Debuts
4 January – The Riordans (1965–1979)
9 October –  Thunderbirds (1965–1966)
Undated – Quicksilver (1965–1981)

Ongoing television programmes
RTÉ News: Nine O'Clock (1961–present)
Dáithí Lacha (1962–1969)
RTÉ News: Six One (1962–present)
The Late Late Show (1962–present)
Tolka Row (1964–1968)
Newsbeat (1964–1971)

Ending this year
9 June – Jackpot (1962–1965)

Births
8 October – Ardal O'Hanlon, comedian and actor

See also
1965 in Ireland

References

 
1960s in Irish television